Theatrical Madness is the second full-length album by the Danish band Evil Masquerade.

Track listing
When Satan Calls - 3:53	
Theatrical Madness - 5:11	
Bozo the Clown - 4:38
Now When Our Stars Are Fading - 6:32
A Great Day To Die - 4:21
Demolition Army - 4:08	
Snow White - 1:44
Witches Chant - 4:16
Other Ways To Babylon - 5:06
The Dark Play - 5:11
Outro - 0:34

The Japanese version of the album contains the bonus track:  

Yes Sir, I Can Boogie (originally released 1977 by Spanish female disco duo Baccara).

Personnel
Henrik Flyman - guitar, vocals
Henrik Brockmann - lead vocals
Dennis Buhl - drums
Kasper Gram - bass guitar

Guest musicians
André Andersen - keyboard
Richard Andersson - keyboard
Mikkel Jensen - keyboard
Not Just Any Choir - choir
Katja Handberg - female choir
Sanna Thor - female choir
Juruda Bendtsen - female choir
Monika Pedersen - vocals
Tommy Hansen - Moog and bongo

Production
Written, composed, arranged and produced by Henrik Flyman, lyrics for "Snow White" by Katja Handberg/Henrik Flyman, lyrics for "Witches Chant" by William Shakespeare/Henrik Flyman.
Recorded by Henrik Flyman at Digital Bitch, drums recorded by Tommy Hansen at Jailhouse Studios.
Mixed and mastered by Tommy Hansen at Jailhouse Studios.
Paintings by Katja Handberg
Photos by Thomas Trane
Artwork by Gunbarrel Offensive Design
Originally released by Marquee/Avalon. Re-released by Dark Minstrel Music

References

Evil Masquerade albums
2005 albums